The Giant Forest, famed for its giant sequoia trees, is within the United States' Sequoia National Park.

Five of the ten most massive trees on Earth are located within the Giant Forest. It is also among the longest-lived of all trees in the world.

The area

Giant Forest is close to Crystal Cave, Moro Rock and Crescent Meadow.

The western trailhead of the High Sierra Trail which crosses the Sierra Nevada to Mount Whitney is at the Crescent Meadow parking area.

Ponderosa, Jeffrey, Sugar, and Lodgepole pine trees are common here, as well as white and red fir. Visitors often see mule deer, Douglas squirrel, and American black bear. The National Park Service warns visitors not to leave any food in unattended vehicles because bears may break in to steal food.

Giant Forest is unique among sequoia groves in that it contains large water-storing fen meadows such as Round Meadow, Crescent Meadow and Circle Meadow.

Giant Forest Village
The giant sequoia trees are first encountered on the approach from the south at Giant Forest Village—a small cluster of buildings that is dwarfed by the surrounding trees. The sequoia forest extends mainly east of the village, and is accessed by a  side road plus many interconnecting foot trails. The area is generally quite sheltered and receives high rainfall, which is one reason why the sequoia attain such size, but these conditions are also ideal for mosquitoes, which are abundant in the forests most of the year. These provide the only real hazard—the paths are generally quite level and well shaded from the sun.

History
Once the home of nearly 300 buildings, the region now has four, with no commercial activity. It is a designated "day use" area. The Giant Forest Lodge Historic District was designated in 1978, encompassing the main area of development in the Giant Forest grove. The development was demolished between 1995 and 2000, with day use features moving to the nearby Giant Forest Village–Camp Kaweah Historic District, which was itself extensively altered, and overnight visitor services moving to Wuksachi Village. The area within the grove was restored to nearly natural conditions, allowing the use of fire for forest management and the germination of new sequoia seedlings.

Access
The forest can be reached from Fresno by State Route 180 or from Visalia by State Route 198. The Generals' Highway connects Giant Forest to Kings Canyon National Park and the General Grant Grove, home to the General Grant tree among other giant sequoias.

Noteworthy trees

Some of the trees found in the grove that are worthy of special note are:
 General Sherman: In 1931 this tree was established to be the largest living thing in the world and, therefore, also the largest tree in the world. The top of the Sherman is a dead limb that at one time served as a leader branch. The second-largest tree in the world, the General Grant, is located about 27 miles away in Kings Canyon National Park.
 President: Recent measurements by arborists who climbed up into the crown of the tree and rappelled down through the limbs have discovered that the President Tree is actually bigger than the General Grant tree and is even beginning to rival the General Sherman Tree as the world's largest.
 Congress group: a grove, located between the General Sherman Tree and the Giant Forest Museum, and further divided into The House and The Senate. The Congress Grove is near the President Tree. It was in 1922, that Colonel John R. White, the superintendent of Sequoia National Park, named the Senate trees to honor the United States Senate. On the Congress Trail, an easy hike of  stroll takes you to The Senate. A short additional distance will add other prominent sequoias.
 Chief Sequoyah: Just uphill from the President tree is the massive and very impressive Chief Sequoyah. This tree is one of the most strikingly rugged trees in the forest.
 Franklin: Although it is the eighth-largest tree in the world, this tree has been largely ignored, perhaps because it is in such a massive grove with many other large specimens. This tree has a huge fire scar on one side and a very large diameter.
 Monroe: The tenth-largest tree in the world.
 General Pershing: The lower trunk is massive and the top is a tapering dead snag.
 Column Tree: About  from the General Pershing is another large sequoia. Its lack of taper makes it the fourteenth-largest giant sequoia.
 Adams Tree: From about  up, the trunk is very irregular with many limb buttresses and much foliage. The top is a maze of limbs.
 Cleveland Tree: One of the 40 largest giant sequoias.
 Ed by Ned: A pair of intertwined giant sequoia trees located at the southern end of Round Meadow; also known as the "Uncle Ned Tree".
 Hazelwood Tree: A large tree that, although reduced by half due to lightning damage sustained in 2002, is still alive.
 Washington tree: Once the second-largest tree in the world, a fire in 2003 and snowstorm in 2005 cost it most of its trunk and size, and it is no longer exceptional.

Gallery

See also
 List of largest giant sequoias
 List of giant sequoia groves
 List of individual trees
 Washington (tree)

References

External links

 National Park Service: Giant Forest Restoration Overview
 On the Congress Trail
 More on the Congress Trail
 Photos on the Congress Trail
 On The Senate
 On the Congress Trail
 Photos
 The House Group of Giant sequoia (Sequoiadendron giganteum) trees on the Congress Trail, Sequoia National Park
 The Congress Trail

Giant sequoia groves
Sequoia National Park
Sequoiadendron
Sequoiadendron
Sequoiadendron